Schocken Department Stores (Kaufhaus Schocken) was a chain of department stores in Germany before World War II.

History
The company was founded by Simon Schocken (1874–1929) and Salman Schocken (1877–1959). After Simon had married into the owner family of Warenhaus Ury Gebrüder in Leipzig, the two brothers enlarged the business to a chain by establishing a second department store in Zwickau. In 1930, the company (named I. Schocken Sons since 1907) had become the fourth largest department store company in Germany with 20 stores. After the death of Simon Schocken in a car crash in 1929, his brother was sole owner.

The most famous stores are the ones in Nuremberg (Aufseßplatz) (built 1925/26, demolished), Stuttgart (→ Schocken Stuttgart, 1926–28, demolished 1960) and Chemnitz (1927–30) designed by  architect Erich Mendelsohn. All three can be seen as milestones in modern architecture.

After the rise of Nazism, Salman Schocken was forced to sell his department stores to the Merkur AG (so-called "Aryanisation"). After the war, Schocken sold his regained share of the company (51%) to Helmut Horten GmbH, which later became part of Kaufhof and is currently owned by Metro.

In 1931, Salman Schocken founded his own publishing house (later Schocken Books) which published books in German and Hebrew.  It later moved to Palestine and the United States. The Schocken family lives in Israel and the United States. Schocken Books is now affiliated with Random House Publishing. The family still owns 60% of the Israeli newspaper Haaretz once owned by Salman Schocken.

References

Further reading 
 Anthony David: The Patron. A Life of S. Schocken 1877–1959. Metropolitan Books, New York 2003. Hebraic edition published Tel Aviv, Schocken, 2006
 

Department stores of Germany
Companies acquired from Jews under Nazi rule